Inferno may refer to:
 Hell, an afterlife place of suffering
 Conflagration, a large uncontrolled fire

Film 
 L'Inferno, a 1911 Italian film
 Inferno (1953 film), a film noir by Roy Ward Baker
 Inferno (1973 film), a German television movie
 Inferno (1980 film), an Italian horror film by Dario Argento
 Inferno (1995 film), directed by Peter Keglevic
 Inferno (1997 film), starring Don "The Dragon" Wilson
 Inferno (1998 film), a TV movie directed by Ian Barry
 Inferno (1999 film), starring Jean-Claude Van Damme
 Inferno (1999 Portuguese film), a 1999 Portuguese film directed by Joaquim Leitão
 Inferno (2000 film), or Pilgrim, 2000 film directed by Harley Cokeliss
 Inferno (2001 film), a British "short" movie directed by Paul Kousoulides
 Inferno (2002 film), directed by Dusty Nelson
 Inferno (2014 film), a Slovenian film, directed by Vinko Möderndorfer
 Inferno (2016 film), American thriller based on Dan Brown's novel of same name

Literature 

 Inferno (Dante), the first part of Dante's Divine Comedy
 Inferno (Strindberg novel), an 1897 novel by August Strindberg
 Inferno (Barbusse novel) (or Hell), a 1908 novel by Henri Barbusse
 Inferno, a concept of infernality of Nature in The Bull's Hour, a 1968 novel by Ivan Yefremov
 Inferno (Niven and Pournelle novel), a 1976 novel by Larry Niven and Jerry Pournelle
 Isaac Asimov's Inferno, a 1994 novel by Roger MacBride Allen
 Inferno, a 2006 novel in the Bionicle Legends series, by Greg Farshtey
 Inferno (Star Wars novel), a 2007 novel by Troy Denning
 Inferno (anthology), a 2007 anthology edited by Ellen Datlow
 Inferno, a 2010 novel by Eileen Myles
 Inferno (Brown novel), a 2013 novel by Dan Brown

Music 
 Infernö, a Norwegian thrash metal band
 Inferno Metal Festival, annual music festival in Oslo, Norway
 Zbigniew Robert Promiński or Inferno (born 1978), drummer with the band Behemoth
 Inferno, guitarist with Cirith Gorgor

Albums 
 Inferno (Marty Friedman album), 2014
 Inferno (Petra Marklund album), 2012
 Inferno (Motörhead album), 2004
 Inferno (Entombed album), 2003
 Inferno (Biréli Lagrène album), 1988
 Inferno (Metamorfosi album), 1973
 Inferno: Last in Live, a 1998 album by Dio
 Inferno (soundtrack), a soundtrack album by Keith Emerson, from the 1980 film (see below)
 Inferno (Tangerine Dream album)
 Inferno, an album by Alien Sex Fiend which is the soundtrack for the video game Inferno
 Inferno, an album by Project Pitchfork

Songs 
 "Inferno" (song), a song by Bella Poarch and Sub Urban
 "Inferno", a song by Kreator from Voices of Transgression – A 90s Retrospective
 "Inferno", a song by Amaranthe from Helix
 "Inferno (Unleash the Fire)", a song by Symphony X from The Odyssey
 "Inferno", a song by Lordi

Television 

 "Inferno", fourth episode of the 1965 Doctor Who serial The Romans
 Inferno (Doctor Who), a 1970 serial from the British science fiction series
 "Inferno" (Stargate Atlantis), an episode in the science fiction series
 "Inferno" (Captain Scarlet), an episode of Captain Scarlet and the Mysterons
 Series titles of reality game shows on MTV:
 Real World/Road Rules Challenge: The Inferno (2004)
 Real World/Road Rules Challenge: The Inferno II (2005)
 Real World/Road Rules Challenge: The Inferno 3 (2007)
 Inferno, a female gladiator in Gladiators
 Team Inferno, Disney Channel Games Red Team

Comics 

 Inferno (DC Comics), a character in Legion of Super-Heroes
 Inferno (Frank Verrano), a Mighty Crusaders character
 Inferno (Exemplar), a character in the Marvel Comics team Exemplars
 Inferno (Marvel Comics), a crossover involving the X-Men
 Inferno!, a Warhammer anthology magazine mixing text and comic stories
 Inferno, a title from Caliber Comics
 Armageddon: Inferno, a DC Comics storyline connected with Armageddon 2001
 Judge Dredd: Inferno, a story line featuring Judge Grice
 Inferno, an alternate version of Legion of Super-Heroes member Sun Boy
 Inferno (Dante Pertuz), a Marvel Comics character

Gaming 

 Inferno (Judges Guild), a 1980 adventure for fantasy role-playing games, a 'paper and pencil' game
 Inferno, an episode in the video game Doom
 Inferno (video game), a 1994 space flight simulation game by Digital Image Design
 Inferno (Soulcalibur), a boss character in Soulcalibur
 Alone in the Dark: Inferno, an updated version of the video game Alone in the Dark
Little Inferno, a 2012 puzzle game

Sports teams
 Brampton Inferno, a Canadian Lacrosse League team
 Columbia Inferno, an ECHL hockey team based in Columbia, South Carolina
 Indianapolis Inferno, a Great Lakes Junior Hockey League team
 Lancaster Inferno (NPSL), a defunct National Premier Soccer League team (2008)
 Lancaster Inferno (UWS), a Women's Premier Soccer League team
 Phoenix Inferno, a defunct Major Indoor Soccer League team (1980–1983)
 Tampa Bay Inferno, a Women's Football Alliance team
 The teams of Alverno College, a Roman Catholic college in Milwaukee, Wisconsin
West Carleton Inferno a National Capital Junior Hockey League team

Other uses 

 Pedro de Ataíde Inferno, Captain-major of Portuguese Ceylon from 1564 to 1565
 Operation Inferno, a 1968 Israeli Defense Forces raid that escalated into the Battle of Karameh
 Inferno (G.I. Joe), a fictional character in the G.I. Joe universe
 Inferno (wrestler), ring name of wrestler Jemma Palmer
 Inferno Peak, Antarctica
 Inferno Ridge, Antarctica
 Inferno (horse), a Canadian Thoroughbred racehorse
 Inferno (operating system), a distributed operating system started at Bell Labs
 Inferno (software), a visual effects software system
Kyosho Inferno, a radio-controlled car produced by Kyosho

See also 
 Infernus (born 1972)
 Dante's Inferno (disambiguation)
 Infernal (disambiguation)
 Towering Inferno (disambiguation)